Dyah Roro Esti Widya Putri (born 25 May 1993), commonly referred to as Esti, is an Indonesian politician who is currently serving as a member of the People's Representative Council from the East Java X constituency which includes the Gresik and Lamongan Regencies since 2019. A member of the Golkar party, she is also serving as the Deputy General Treasurer of Golkar and as a member of the Commission VII of the People's Representative Council, with scope of duties in the fields of Energy, Research and Technology, and the Environment. She is the child of former member of the People's Representative Council Satya Widya Yudha.

Early life, family, and education

Early life and family 
Esti was born in Jakarta, on 25 May 1993. Her father is Satya Widya Yudha, a politician and businessman, and her mother is Diah Ambarsari. She has a single sibling, Satya Hangga Yudha Widya Putra, who is the President of Michigan State University Alumni Association and the co-founder of the Indonesian Energy and Environmental Institute (alongside Esti).

Education 
Esti attended Marshall Road Elementary, Dwight School London, Global Jaya School, Beijing International School, Ho Chi Minh City International School, and Jakarta International School prior to University. She then attended and graduated from the University of Manchester, with a bachelor's degree in Economics and Sociology. After completing her undergraduate studies, Esti also attended and completed graduate-level courses from Harvard University. Esti was also a recipient of a full scholarship of the Education Fund Management Institute from the Ministry of Finance of the Republic of Indonesia, holding an MSc in Environmental Technology (with a focus in Pollution Management) from Imperial College London.

Early career 
After graduating from the Imperial College London, she alongside her brother, Hangga, co-founded the Indonesian Energy and Environmental Institute. The institute is an NGO dedicated to raising awareness about global warming and the negative consequences of climate change based in Jakarta, Indonesia. Esti would go on to serve as the institute's Executive Director from 2016 until 2019.

Political career 
In 2019, Esti ran for a seat in the People's Representative Council in the East Java X constituency which includes the Gresik and Lamongan Regencies. She ran as a member of Golkar, and campaigned in the district by meeting people. She was accompanied by her father, who came from the neighboring East Java IX electoral district, which included the Tuban and Bojonegoro regencies. She won the election, with 48.377 votes, taking office on 1 October 2019.

As a member of the People's Representative Council, she has been notable for proposing that the Commission VII of the DPR (of which she is a part of) be disbanded because now it only has one ministry/institutional partner.

In July 2021, Esti held a talk show known as 'Roro Talks' with the theme 'Woman in Politics' through the Live Instagram feature with several other female politicians. Including Krisdayanti and Tsamara Amany.

References 

Members of the People's Representative Council, 2019
1993 births
Living people